Daryl Lashay Richardson (born April 12, 1990) is a former American football running back. He was drafted by the St. Louis Rams in the seventh round of the 2012 NFL Draft. He played college football at Abilene Christian.

College career
Richardson attended Cisco College in 2008, a local Texas community college where he rushed for 526 yards and 7 touchdowns on 95 attempts.

Richardson then transferred to Abilene Christian, which he attended from 2009 to 2011. Appearing in 34 games with 23 starts for the Wildcats, Richardson amassed 2,303 yards on 453 carries with 34 touchdowns.

Professional career

St. Louis Rams
Richardson was selected in the seventh round (252nd overall) of the 2012 NFL Draft. He was picked second to last in the draft, the only player behind him was Northern Illinois quarterback Chandler Harnish, who was selected by the Indianapolis Colts with the 253rd pick.

On June 6, 2012, Richardson signed a four-year contract with the Rams worth $2.15 million. During his rookie campaign, he was the primary backup to then Rams starting running back Steven Jackson over fellow draftee, second-round pick Isaiah Pead. Richardson played in all 16 games, gaining 475 rushing yards on 98 attempts, as well as 24 receptions for 163 yards. His best performance came in Week 2 of the regular season against the Washington Redskins when he rushed 15 times for 83 yards and scored a 2-point conversion.

Richardson was waived by the Rams on May 15, 2014.

New York Jets
Richardson was claimed off waivers by the New York Jets on May 16, 2014. He was released on August 30, 2014, but signed to the team's practice squad a day later. Richardson was signed a to reserve/future contract on December 30, 2014. The Jets released Richardson as part of their final roster cuts following the 2015 preseason.

Houston Texans
The Houston Texans signed Richardson to their practice squad on September 23, 2015, before releasing him on October 20. The Houston Texans signed Richardson to their practice squad again on October 28, 2015.

Cleveland Browns
Richardson signed with the Cleveland Browns on December 15, 2015. Richardson was inactive for 2 games after being signed. The Cleveland Browns waived Richardson on December 28, 2015.

Pittsburgh Steelers
On January 20, 2016, the Pittsburgh Steelers signed Richardson to a future/reserve contract. He was released by the Steelers on September 29, 2016, and was signed to the Steelers' practice squad on October 3. He was promoted to the active roster on November 19, 2016. He was released on December 24, 2016.

Jacksonville Jaguars
Richardson was claimed off waivers by the Jaguars on December 26, 2016. On May 1, 2017, he was released by the Jaguars.

Indianapolis Colts
On August 29, 2017, Richardson signed with the Indianapolis Colts. He was released by the team on September 2, 2017.

San Antonio Commanders (AAF)
On January 30, 2019, Richardson was released by the Commanders as part of the final training camp cuts.

Personal life
Richardson is the brother of running back Bernard Scott, and cousin of wide receiver Clyde Gates. Richardson married Morgan Myrick, his college sweetheart, at Abilene Christian University on March 21, 2015.

References

External links

 Abilene Christian bio
 St. Louis Rams bio
 New York Jets bio

1990 births
Living people
People from Vernon, Texas
Players of American football from Texas
American football running backs
Abilene Christian Wildcats football players
St. Louis Rams players
New York Jets players
Houston Texans players
Cleveland Browns players
Pittsburgh Steelers players
Jacksonville Jaguars players
Indianapolis Colts players
San Antonio Commanders players
Cisco Wranglers football players